Ehsan-ul-Haq Piracha (1932-2019 |احسان الحق پراچہ}}) was a Pakistani politician.
 He was from the town of Bhera in Sargodha District, Punjab, Pakistan.

Ehsan ul-Haq Piracha died in Islamabad on 1 February 2019.

References

Image of Ehsan-ul-Haq Piracha

Finance Ministers of Pakistan
Pakistan People's Party politicians
Pakistani lawyers
2019 deaths
Government College University, Lahore alumni
1932 births